Valentina Vernigorova (born 15 June 1997) is a Russian handballer who plays for Dinamo-Sinara and the Russia national team.

References
 

    
1997 births
Living people
Sportspeople from Volgograd
Russian female handball players  
Handball players at the 2014 Summer Youth Olympics